The Buccaneers is a 1924 American short silent comedy film directed by Robert F. McGowan. It was the 23rd Our Gang short subject released.

Plot
The gang decides to be pirates and build a boat, which sinks immediately upon launching. The boys then blame Mary because she is a girl. Friendly sea captain, Capt. Whelan, tells her she can play pirate on his fishing boat and the boys join her. Their boat accidentally gets set free of her moorings and the gang has adventures on the “high seas” of the harbor, until they are boarded by the U.S. Navy battleship .

Production notes
When the silent Pathé Our Gang comedies were syndicated for television as "The Mischief Makers" in 1960, The Buccaneers was retitled The Pirates.

Cast

The Gang
 Joe Cobb as Joe
 Jackie Condon as Jackie
 Mickey Daniels as Mickey
 Allen Hoskins as Farina
 Mary Kornman as Mary
 Ernie Morrison as Sunshine Sammy
 Andy Samuel as Andy

Additional cast
 Allen Cavan as Capt. Whelan
 Dick Gilbert as police officer
 Earl Mohan as naval officer
 "Tonnage" Martin Wolfkeil as fat sailor

See also
 Our Gang filmography

References

External links

1924 comedy films
1924 films
American black-and-white films
Films directed by Robert F. McGowan
American silent short films
Hal Roach Studios short films
Our Gang films
1924 short films
1920s American films
Silent American comedy films
1920s English-language films